Plus Rien means 'Nothing Left' (literally, 'more nothing') in French, and might refer to:
An EP released by the band Vanessa and the O's
A song written by Vanessa Contenay, James Iha, Niclas Frisk and Andreas Mattsson aka Vanessa and the O's
A song by Québécois group Les Cowboys Fringants